Hell Train is the fourth record by Soltero and was recorded by Tim Shea and Jesse Kudler. It was originally released in a limited run of 500 in March 2005 and later repressed in November 2005.

Track listing

 If I Had a Chance 
 The Prize
 From The Station 
 Bleeding Hearts
 Michael
 Step Through The Door
 Hands Up 
 A Single Good Evening
 Four O'Clocker
 Acadian Coast
 Songs Of The Season 
 Ghost At The Foot Of The Bed
 Rosie Day

References

2005 albums
Soltero albums